Ferenz is a surname. Notable people with the surname include:

Amber Ferenz (born 1972), American musician, music educator, and composer
Ion Ferenz (born 1932), Romanian ice hockey player